(plural ;  ;) is a dish generally consisting of fried pork belly or fried pork rinds.  may also be made from chicken, mutton or beef.

Name
It is part of the traditional cuisines of Bolivia, Brazil, Portugal (where it is called ), Chile, Colombia, Costa Rica, Cuba, the Dominican Republic, Ecuador, Guam, Guatemala, Haiti, Honduras, El Salvador, Mexico, Nicaragua, Panama, Peru, the Philippines, Puerto Rico, Venezuela, Belize and others. The singular form of the term or a variant of it is also used as a mass noun in Filipino and Tagalog, in which stand-alone plurals do not exist.  are usually made from various cuts of pork but sometimes with mutton, chicken or other meats. In some places they are made from pork ribs with skin attached and other meatier cuts rather than just rinds.

National variants
The pork rind variant is the skin of the pork after it has been seasoned and deep fried often to a crispy, puffy state. Other styles may be fatty or meaty, not fried as much, and sometimes attached to ribs or other bones. Serving styles vary widely, including main course, side dish, filling for tortillas and other bread, the meat portion of stews, and as finger-food snacks.

Croatia 
In Croatia they are called Čvarci. Usually made during the slaughter of pigs for the winter. Usually cooked with milk and lard to give them a nice gold color after they have been pressed through a pressure sift to make them have the texture of chips. Very common in villages in Slavonia like Ladimirevci.

Belize
In Belize, chicharrón can be served with escabeche (onion soup). Chicharron in Belize is also made from beef skin.

Brazil
In Brazil, it is known as torresmo. The dish may be seasoned with garlic, pepper, and/or other spices. It is cooked in its own fat or oil; the finished product is typically complemented with a wedge of lime.

Bolivia
 is made of pork ribs seasoned with garlic, oregano and lemon. There are other variations of chicharrón made with chicken and fish.

Canada
 is a traditional Quebec dish consisting of deep-fried salted fatback. It is generally served in cabanes à sucre (sugar shacks) in spring time, as a "palate cleanser" between maple syrup-laden foods.

Colombia
 is made from deep-fried pig skin with meat attached, but it can also be made from chicken skin.

Chile
 are made of fat, sometimes with a bit of meat, and are typically served with homemade bread.

Costa Rica
 are made by frying pork (usually ribs) in fat, and are associated with several dishes.

Dominican Republic
 is usually eaten with tostones. It is prepared by washing and drying pork and cutting it into small pieces, which are seasoned with a mix of lemon juice and salt.

El Salvador
 are often filled with chopped  as a stuffing.

Guam

Guatemala
 is eaten with tortillas, lime, guacamole, and moronga, and sometimes served with pico de gallo or Chirmol salsa. (In other places, carnitas generally refers to fried pork meat without skin or a stew-like dish made from it.)

Mexico
Besides  made from pig skin and fat, snack-food companies Barcel and Sabritas have commercialized vegetarian versions (primarily made of puffed cornmeal batter) with chile and lemon flavorings since the 1980s.  are also distributed by many salty snack companies in Mexico, sold in supermarkets, and made and sold by markets, and street vendors. North Mexico is made with fried pork belly (and have more meat, than the south Mexico), is more based on Spanish torreznos.

New Mexico
Similar to the Mexican chicharron, its use in New Mexican cuisine is most commonly in bean burritos with chopped New Mexico chile. It is colloquially prepared by frying in a disco, a Wok-like pan made from a repurposed tractor disc blade.

Peru

 in Perú is made using what is called "country-style pork rib" in the United States. The rind (skin and attached fat) is not used at all; instead, the meat is boiled with seasonings and spices until no water remains and then fried in its own fat. It is often served as a breakfast or brunch food on a baguette with a relish made of red onion and lime juice.  can be eaten as an appetizer or snack, and the chicken variant can taste like fried chicken found in the United States. Sides include a kind of red onion relish, fried yuca, and other regional variants.  can also be prepared with fish rather than pork.

Philippines

, less commonly spelled , is ubiquitous, as it is a well-loved snack, and may be bought anywhere, from large supermarket chains to small neighborhood  stores and street vendors. It is also used as a topping on many native vegetable and noodle dishes. Pork  is prepared by deep-frying dried pork rind with a little salt. It may be dipped in coconut vinegar spiced with soy sauce, chopped garlic and  chili peppers, or eaten with other condiments like  anchovies,  gravy sauce, or  papaya salad.

Aside from pork rind, chicken skin may also be made into , whereas —literally 'flower chicharrón', named for its distinctive shape—is made from pork mesentery.

Tuna-skin  is marketed as a healthier variation. In Cagayan, water buffalo hide is used to make "carabao chicharon".

A distinct variant of chicharon involves cooking pork loin and meat in the same way, becoming bagnet. While similar and dissimilar to crispy pata, it is more popular as a meal than finger food, and has found its way to contemporary dishes and restaurants. Bagnet originates from Ilocos where it has been served since the 1960s.

Puerto Rico
The city of Bayamón – nicknamed the "city of " – is famous for the  produced locally, as is the Guavate barrio in the city of Cayey.  is a popular ingredient in Puerto Rican rice with added sofrito, pigeon peas, spices and other ingredients. Rusiao de yuca like pasteles are made from grated cassava that has been dehydrated, toasted, then notably rehydrate with coconut milk into masa and seasoned with anise, mashed or finely chopped chicharrón, oregano among other ingredients. They are then wrapped in banana leaf and grilled.

United States
US-style pork rinds are usually made from pig skin and fat without meat. They are commonly seasoned and sold in plastic bags, like corn and potato chips as a "junk food" item. Some brands in the Southwest use the Spanish term , and Mexican-style  dishes are available in many Mexican and Southwestern restaurants in the region.  In the Deep South, traditional home-cooked pork rinds are called cracklings or (colloquially) cracklins. They are made in a two-step process: the pork skin is first rendered and dried, and then fried and puffed. In New Mexico, the term is often taken to mean just fried pork fat, sometimes with incidental bits of lean meat.

Uruguay
Chicharrones are a byproduct of tallow making in Uruguay. Usually extracted from the softest fat of the cow located on the kidneys, this fat is known as grasa de pella. The pella is heated until melt and the solid residue are the chicharrones. Chicharrones are traditionally used as additive for a typical bread called rosca de chicharrones.

Venezuela
The recipe usually produces crispy sizable portions of pork skin with the underlying meat. The  type are also made with pork skin and marinated in vinegar instead of deep fried. They are eaten as a snack.

Other countries
Pork rind is also eaten in many other countries in forms unrelated to the  tradition. For example, in Denmark,  is pork skin deep-fried with or without a layer of fat. It is usually eaten as a snack, like crisps (chips) or popcorn. At Christmas-time it is also traditional to eat fried strips of pork belly the skin on, with or without meat in addition to fat.
In the countryside in Greece, during Christmas time people prepare "tsigarídes" which is deep fried pork belly skin. In the United Kingdom Pork Rinds are called "pork scratchings". They are a popular snack sold in pubs and bars, packaged in small plastic bags like potato crisps.

Similar foods
 Duros, also known as chicharrones
 Lechon kawali
 Papadum
 Philippine cuisine
 Torreznos
 Tocino
 Siu yuk
 Tepertő

See also

 Latin American cuisine
 List of pork dishes

References

Andalusian cuisine
Bolivian cuisine
Chilean cuisine
Colombian cuisine
Costa Rican cuisine
Cuban cuisine
Cuisine of the Southwestern United States
Deep fried foods
Dominican Republic cuisine
Guamanian cuisine
Guatemalan cuisine
Honduran cuisine
Mexican cuisine
New Mexican cuisine
Nicaraguan cuisine
Panamanian cuisine
Peruvian cuisine
Philippine cuisine
Puerto Rican cuisine
Snack foods
Venezuelan cuisine
Spanish pork dishes
Latin American pork dishes